Golino may refer to:

People 
Carlo Golino (1913-1991), Italian academic and educator 
Enzo Golino (1932−2020), Italian journalist and literary critic
Valeria Golino (born 1965), Italian actress and director

Other uses 
Golino, a settlement in Centovalli, Ticino, Switzerland